The 1987 Yale Bulldogs football team represented Yale University in the 1987 NCAA Division I-AA football season. The Bulldogs were led by 23rd-year head coach Carmen Cozza, played their home games at the Yale Bowl and finished in third place in the Ivy League with a 5–2 record, 7–3 overall.

Schedule

References

Yale
Yale Bulldogs football seasons
Yale Bulldogs football